Nova Vas pri Konjicah is a small settlement in the Municipality of Slovenske Konjice in eastern Slovenia. The A1 Slovenian motorway runs through the settlement. The area is part of the traditional region of Styria. The municipality is now included in the Savinja Statistical Region.

Name
The name of the settlement was changed from Nova vas to Nova vas pri Konjicah in 1953.

References

External links
Nova Vas pri Konjicah at Geopedia

Populated places in the Municipality of Slovenske Konjice